Andrew Phillip Harmon (born April 6, 1969) is a former American football defensive tackle in the National Football League. He was drafted by the Philadelphia Eagles in the sixth round of the 1991 NFL Draft. He played college football at Kent State.

Harmon has now settled down in Centerville, Ohio.

He is second behind Fletcher Cox on the Philadelphia Eagles all-time sack list among defensive tackles with 39.5.

References

1969 births
Living people
Players of American football from Dayton, Ohio
American football defensive tackles
Kent State Golden Flashes football players
Philadelphia Eagles players
People from Centerville, Ohio